Abraham Elzevir (4 April 1592 — 14 August 1652) was a Dutch printer.

Elzevir was born and died in Leiden.  He inherited the House of Elzevir from his grandfather Louis Elzevir and his uncle Bonaventure Elzevir. In its best years it was reputedly the greatest publishing business in the world, with filials in numerous European cities.

Abraham and Bonaventure launched a bestselling series of books called the Republics. Published in Latin between 1626 and 1629, each work in the series gave information on the geography, inhabitants, economy, and history of a particular country in Europe, Asia, Africa, or the Near East. The Republics are often considered the forerunner to the modern travel guide.

References

External links

1592 births
1652 deaths
Printers from the Dutch Republic
People from Leiden
17th-century printers
17th-century Dutch businesspeople